Tulsa County is located in the U.S. state of Oklahoma. As of the 2020 census, the population was 669,279, making it the second-most populous county in Oklahoma, behind only Oklahoma County. Its county seat and largest city is Tulsa, the second-largest city in the state. Founded at statehood, in 1907, it was named after the previously established city of Tulsa. Before statehood, the area was part of both the Creek Nation and the Cooweescoowee District of Cherokee Nation in Indian Territory.

Tulsa County is included in the Tulsa Metropolitan Statistical Area.

Tulsa County is notable for being the most densely populated county in the state. Tulsa County also ranks as having the highest income.

History
The history of Tulsa County greatly overlaps the history of the city of Tulsa. This section addresses events that largely occurred outside the present city limits of Tulsa.

Lasley Vore Site
The Lasley Vore Site, along the Arkansas River south of Tulsa, was claimed by University of Tulsa anthropologist George Odell to be the most likely place where Jean-Baptiste Bénard de la Harpe first encountered a group of Wichita people in 1719. Odell's statement was based on finding both Wichita and French artifacts there during an architectural dig in 1988.

Old Fort Arbuckle
The U. S. Government's removal of Native American tribes from the southeastern United States to "Indian Territory" did not take into account how that would impact the lives and attitudes of the nomadic tribes that already used the same land as their hunting grounds. At first, Creek immigrants stayed close to Fort Gibson, near the confluence of the Arkansas and Verdigris rivers. However, the government encouraged newer immigrants to move farther up the Arkansas. The Osage tribe had agreed to leave the land near the Verdigris, but had not moved far and soon threatened the new Creek settlements.

In 1831, a party led by Rev. Isaac McCoy and Lt. James L. Dawson blazed a trail up the north side of the Arkansas from Fort Gibson to its junction with the Cimarron River. In 1832, Dawson was sent again to select sites for military posts. One of his recommended sites was about two and a half miles downstream from the Cimarron River junction. The following year, Brevet Major George Birch and two companies of the 7th Infantry Regiment followed the "Dawson Road" to the aforementioned site. Flattering his former commanding officer, General Matthew Arbuckle, Birch named the site "Fort Arbuckle."

Author James Gardner visited the site in the early 1930s. His article describing the visit includes an old map showing the fort located on the north bank of the Arkansas River near Sand Creek, just south of the line separating Tulsa County and Osage County. After ground was cleared and a blockhouse built, Fort Arbuckle was abandoned November 11, 1834. The remnants of stockade and some chimneys could still be seen nearly a hundred years later. The site was submerged when Keystone Lake was built.

Battle of Chusto-Talasah
Main article Battle of Chusto-Talasah

At the outbreak of the Civil War in 1861, many Creeks and Seminoles in Indian Territory, led by Opothleyahola, retained their allegiance to the U. S. Government. In November, 1861, Confederate Col. Douglas H. Cooper led a Confederate force against the Union supporters with the purpose of either compelling their submission or driving them out of the country. The first clash, known as the Battle of Round Mountain, occurred November 19, 1861. Although the Unionists successfully withstood the attack and mounted a counterattack, the Confederates claimed a strategic victory because the Unionists were forced to withdraw.

The next battle occurred December 9, 1861. Col. Cooper's force attacked the Unionists at Chusto-Talasah (Caving Banks) on the Horseshoe Bend of Bird Creek in what is now Tulsa County. The Confederates drove the Unionists across Bird Creek, but could not pursue, because they were short of ammunition. Still, the Confederates could claim victory.

Coming of the railroads
The Atlantic and Pacific Railroad had extended its main line in Indian Territory from Vinita to Tulsa in 1883, where it stopped on the east side of the Arkansas River. The company, which later merged into the St. Louis and San Francisco Railway (familiarly known as the Frisco),  then built a steel bridge across the river to extend the line to Red Fork. This bridge allowed cattlemen to load their animals onto the railroad west of the Arkansas instead of fording the river, as had been the practice previously.  It also provided a safer and more convenient way to bring workers from Tulsa to the oil field after the 1901 discovery of oil in Red Fork.

Oil Boom
A wildcat well named Sue Bland No. 1 hit paydirt at 540 feet on June 25, 1901, as a gusher. The well was on the property of Sue A. Bland (née Davis), located near the community of Red Fork. Mrs. Bland was a Creek citizen and wife of Dr. John C. W. Bland, the first practicing physician in Tulsa. The property was Mrs. Bland's homestead allotment. Oil produced by the well was shipped in barrels to the nearest refinery in Kansas, where it was sold for $1.00 a barrel.

Other producing wells followed soon after. The next big strike in Tulsa County was the of Glenn Pool Oil Reserve in the vicinity of where Glenpool, Oklahoma was later founded..

Ironically, while the city of Tulsa claimed to be "Oil Capital of the World" for much of the 20th century, a city ordinance banned drilling for oil within the city limits.

Tulsa County Court House
In 1911–1912, Tulsa County built a court house in Tulsa on the northeast corner of Sixth Street and South Boulder Avenue. Yule marble was used in its construction. The land had previously been the site of a mansion owned by George Perryman and his wife.  This was the court house where a mob of white residents gathered on May 31, 1921, threatening to lynch a young black man held in the top-floor jail. It was the beginning of the Tulsa Race Massacre.

An advertisement for bids specified that the building should be fireproof, built of either reinforced concrete or steel and concrete. Cost of the building was not to exceed $200,000. The jail on the top floor was not to exceed $25,000.

The building continued to serve until the present court house building (shown above) opened at 515 South Denver. The old building was then demolished and the land was sold to private investors. The land is now the site of the Bank of America building, completed in 1967.

1921 race riot

In the early 20th century, Tulsa was home to the "Black Wall Street", one of the most prosperous Black communities in the United States at the time. Located in the Greenwood neighborhood, it was the site of the Tulsa Race Massacre, said to be "the single worst incident of racial violence in American history", in which mobs of white Tulsans killed black Tulsans, looted and robbed the black community, and burned down homes and businesses. Sixteen hours of massacring on May 31 and June 1, 1921, ended only when National Guardsmen were brought in by the Governor. An official report later claimed that 23 Black and 16 white citizens were killed, but other estimates suggest as many as 300 people died, most of them Black. Over 800 people were admitted to local hospitals with injuries, and an estimated 1000 Black people were left homeless as 35 city blocks, composed of 1,256 residences, were destroyed by fire. Efforts to obtain reparations for survivors of the violence have been unsuccessful, but the events were re-examined by the city and state in the early 21st century, acknowledging the terrible actions that had taken place.

Geography and climate

The Arkansas River drains most of the county. Keystone Lake, formed by a dam on the Arkansas River, lies partially in the county. Bird Creek and the Caney River, tributaries of the Verdigris River drain the northern part of the county.

Adjacent counties
 Washington County (north)
 Rogers County (northeast)
 Wagoner County (southeast)
 Okmulgee County (south)
 Creek County (west)
 Pawnee County (northwest)
 Osage County (northwest)

Major highways

  Interstate 44
  Interstate 244
  Interstate 444
  U.S. Route 64
  U.S. Historic Route 66
  U.S. Route 75
  U.S. Route 169
  U.S. Route 412
  Creek Turnpike
  Oklahoma State Highway 11
  Former Oklahoma State Highway 12
  Oklahoma State Highway 20
  Oklahoma State Highway 51
  Oklahoma State Highway 67
  Oklahoma State Highway 97
  Oklahoma State Highway 97T
  Oklahoma State Highway 117
  Oklahoma State Highway 151
  Oklahoma State Highway 266
  Oklahoma State Highway 364
  Gilcrease Expressway
  L.L. Tisdale Parkway

Demographics

As of the census of 2010, there were 603,403 people, 241,737 households, and 154,084 families residing in the county.  The population density was 1,059 people per square mile (409/km2). The racial makeup of the county was 69.2% White, 10.7% Black or African American, 6.0% Native American, 2.3% Asian, 0.1% Pacific Islander, 5.8% from other races, and 5.8% from two or more races.  11.0% of the population were Hispanic or Latino of any race (8.8% Mexican). 14.2% were of German, 12.3% Irish, 8.8% English, 8.5% American, 2.3% French, and 2.3% Scottish ancestries. 88.3% spoke English, 8.1% Spanish, and 0.4% Vietnamese as their first language.

There were 241,737 households, out of which 30.1% had children under the age of 18 living with them, 45.3% were married couples living together, 13.3% had a female householder with no husband present, and 36.3% were non-families. 29.60% of all households were made up of individuals, and 22% had someone living alone who was 65 years of age or older.  The average household size was 2.46 and the average family size was 3.07.

In the county, the population was spread out, with 26.30% under the age of 18, 10.00% from 18 to 24, 30.40% from 25 to 44, 21.60% from 45 to 64, and 11.80% who were 65 years of age or older.  The median age was 34 years. For every 100 females, there were 94.20 males.  For every 100 females age 18 and over, there were 90.90 males.

The median income for a household in the county was $47,005, and the median income for a family was $60,093. The per capita income for the county was $27,425. About 11.0% of families and 15.1% of the population were below the poverty line, including 22.6% of those under age 18 and 8.2% of those age 65 or over. Of the county's population over the age of 25, 29.2% held a bachelor's degree or higher, and 88.2% have a high school diploma or equivalent.

Politics
Tulsa County is very conservative for an urban county; it has voted Republican at every election since Franklin Roosevelt’s landslide in 1936. The county's Republican bent predates Oklahoma's swing toward the GOP. As a measure of how Republican the county is, Barry Goldwater won the county by 11 points even as Lyndon Johnson became the last Democrat to date to carry Oklahoma.

Only George H. W. Bush in 1992 has obtained less than a majority for the Republicans in the county since Roosevelt’s landslides, and then only because of Ross Perot’s strong candidacy – although neither Perot nor George Wallace in 1968 made as much impact here as both did in some other parts of Oklahoma. In 2020, Joe Biden became the first Democrat since Lyndon Johnson in 1964 to win more than 40% of the vote in Tulsa County, and only the second to do so since 1948. It is one of only two counties, alongside Oklahoma County, where Biden outperformed Southerner Jimmy Carter's margin as he narrowly lost the state in 1976.

The city of Tulsa proper is a swing city, after voting for Donald Trump in 2016 by four points swung to a six-point Joe Biden win in 2020, and also backed Drew Edmondson for Governor in 2018 by 13 points. The suburbs, however, remain very strongly Republican.

In February 2020, registered Republicans were reduced from a majority to a plurality in the county's voter registration.

Parks and recreation
River Parks was established in 1974 as a joint operation of the City of Tulsa and Tulsa County, with funding from both governments as well as private entities. It is not a part of the Tulsa Parks and Recreation Department, but is managed by the River Parks Authority. Since 2007 a significant portion of the River Parks area has been renovated with new trails, landscaping and playground equipment. The "Tulsa Townies" organization provide bicycles that may be checked out for use. There are three kiosks in the parks where bicycles may be obtained or returned.

Communities

Cities

 Bixby (part)
 Broken Arrow (part)
 Collinsville
 Glenpool
 Jenks
 Owasso (part)
 Sand Springs (part)
 Sapulpa (part)
 Skiatook (part)
 Tulsa (county seat) (part)

Towns
 Liberty (part)
 Lotsee
 Sperry

Census-designated places
 Oakhurst
 Turley

Unincorporated communities
 Berryhill
 Garnett
 Leonard
 Lake
 Mingo

Former communities
 Alsuma - Annexed by Tulsa in 1968.
 Carbondale - Annexed by Tulsa in 1928.
 Dawson - Annexed by Tulsa in 1949.
 Keystone, Oklahoma - Submerged by Keystone Lake, whose construction began in 1958.
 North Tulsa - Annexed by Tulsa in 1904.
 Prattville - Annexed by Sand Springs in 1965.
 Red Fork - Annexed by Tulsa in 1927.
 South Haven - Annexed by Tulsa in 1966.

Education
School districts include:
 Berryhill Public Schools
 Bixby Public Schools
 Broken Arrow Public Schools
 Collinsville Public Schools
 Glenpool Public Schools
 Jenks Public Schools
 Liberty Public Schools
 Owasso Public Schools
 Sand Springs Public Schools
 Skiatook Public Schools
 Sperry Public Schools
 Tulsa Public Schools
 Union Public Schools
 Keystone Public School (elementary only)

NRHP sites

The following sites in Tulsa County are listed on the National Register of Historic Places:

 66 Motel, Tulsa
 Ambassador Hotel, Tulsa
 Bishop Kelley High School
 Boston Avenue United Methodist Church, Tulsa
 Boulder-on-the-Park, Tulsa
 Brady Heights Historic District, Tulsa
 Broken Arrow Elementary--Junior High School, Broken Arrow
 Cain's Dancing Academy, Tulsa
 The Church Studio, Tulsa
 Circle Theater, Tulsa
 Clinton-Hardy House, Tulsa
 Tulsa Convention Hall, Tulsa
 Cosden Building, Tulsa
 Creek Council Oak Tree, Tulsa
 Dawson School, Tulsa
 Carl K. Dresser House, Tulsa
 Eleventh Street Arkansas River Bridge, Tulsa
 Fort Arbuckle Site, Sand Springs
 Gillette Historic District, Tulsa
 Gillette-Tyrell Building, Tulsa (Later named the Pythian Building)
 Harwelden Mansion, Tulsa
 Haskell State School of Agriculture, Broken Arrow
 Holy Family Cathedral, Rectory, and School, Tulsa
 Hooper Brothers Coffee Company Building, Tulsa
 Robert Lawton Jones House, Tulsa
 Maple Ridge Historic Residential District, Tulsa
 Mayo Building, Tulsa
 Mayo Hotel, Tulsa
 Mayo Motor Inn
 James H. McBirney House, Tulsa
 McFarlin Building, Tulsa
 Robert M. McFarlin House, Tulsa
 B. W. McLean House and Office, Jenks
 Mincks-Adams Hotel, Tulsa
 Moore Manor, Tulsa
 Mount Zion Baptist Church, Tulsa
 North Cheyenne Historic District, Tulsa
 Oil Capital of the World Historic District
 Oklahoma Natural Gas Company Building, Tulsa
 Owen Park Historic District, Tulsa
 Page Memorial Library, Sand Springs
 Foster B. Parriott House, Tulsa
 Petroleum Building, Tulsa
 Philcade Building, Tulsa
 Phillips 66 Station 473, Tulsa
 Waite Phillips Mansion (now Philbrook Museum), Tulsa
 Philtower, Tulsa
 Pierce Block, Tulsa
 Public Service of Oklahoma Building, Tulsa
 Ranch Acres Historic Residential District, Tulsa
 Riverside Historic Residential District, Tulsa
 Riverside Studio, Tulsa
 Sand Springs Power Plant, Sand Springs
 Sinclair Service Station, Tulsa
 William G. Skelly House, Tulsa
 Southwestern Bell Main Dial Building, Tulsa
 St. John Vianney Training School for Girls, Tulsa
 Swan Lake Historic District, Tulsa
 Tracy Park Historic District
 Tribune Building, Tulsa
 Tulsa Fire Alarm Building, Tulsa
 Tulsa Municipal Building, Tulsa
 United States Post Office and Courthouse, Tulsa
 James Alexander Veasey House, Tulsa
 Vickery Phillips 66 Station, Tulsa
 Westhope, Tulsa
 White City Historic District, Tulsa
 Woodward Park and Gardens Historic District
 Yorktown Historic District, Tulsa

See also

 Lasley Vore Site
 Yule marble

References

External links
 Tulsa County Government's website
 Oklahoma Digital Maps: Digital Collections of Oklahoma and Indian Territory

 
1907 establishments in Oklahoma
Populated places established in 1907
Tulsa metropolitan area